Raja Bhup Deo Singh Bahadur (1867–1917) was the Raja of Raigarh and Chief of Bargarh ruled by Gond dynasty. He was the ruler of the Princely state of Raigarh from 1894 till his death in 1917. He was son of Raja Deo Nath Singh. Bhup Deo Singh was installed on throne on 1894 with title of Raja. British Gazetteer mentions he was educated and exercised personal control over affairs of his state In 1911 status of the state was raised and the title Raja Bahadur was given to the rulers by British. He died in 1917 and his son Raja Natwar Singh succeeded him as next ruler.

References

1867 births
1917 deaths
Rajas of Raigarh
Founders of Indian schools and colleges